The  is a Japanese Grade 2 flat horse race in Japan for three-year-old Thoroughbred colts and fillies run over a distance of 2,000 metres at the Nakayama Racecourse, Funabashi, Chiba. The race is run in March and serves as a major trial race for the Satsuki Sho. Yayoi means "March" in ancient Japanese calendar.

The race was run at Tokyo Racecourse in 1965, 1966, 1967, 1969, 1970 and 1988. Among the winners of the race have been Mr C B, Symboli Rudolf, Special Week, Agnes Tachyon, Deep Impact, Admire Moon and Victoire Pisa.

In October 2019, JRA decided to change the name to Yayoi Sho (Deep Impact Kinen) in memory of the late Deep Impact..

Winners since 1995

Earlier winners

 1964 - Tokino Parade
 1965 - Keystone
 1966 - Tama Shuho
 1967 - Asa Denko
 1968 - Asaka O
 1969 - Wild More
 1970 - Tanino Moutiers
 1971 - Mejiro Gekko
 1972 - Long Ace
 1973 - Haiseko
 1974 - Colonel Symboli
 1975 - Kaburaya O
 1976 - Climb Kaiser
 1977 - Lucky Ruler
 1978 - Fantast
 1979 - Rikiai O
 1980 - Tosho God
 1981 - Todoroki Hiho
 1982 - Saruno King
 1983 - Mr C B
 1984 - Symboli Rudolf
 1985 - Suda Hawk
 1986 - Daishin Fubuki
 1987 - Sakura Star O
 1988 - Sakura Chiyono O
 1989 - Rainbow Amber
 1990 - Mejiro Ryan
 1991 - Ibuki Maikagura
 1992 - Asaka Regent
 1993 - Winning Ticket
 1994 - Sakura Eiko O

See also
 Horse racing in Japan
 List of Japanese flat horse races

References

Turf races in Japan